is an anime based on the Inazuma Eleven GO (manga). 10 years after the FFI, an unnoticed darkness lurks behind the country. Japan and what used to be soccer has changed during the 10 years that have passed. In this time, soccer is different from before and has become a reason for people to lose hope and stop playing for those who enjoy soccer. The new main protagonist, Matsukaze Tenma tries out for the Raimon soccer team and passes but in a match with another team, he soon realizes that soccer is much different from what he has expected it to be.
Now, soccer in Japan is controlled by an organization called Fifth Sector and is led by the one known as the “Holy Emperor”, namely Ishido Shuuji (who is later revealed to be Gouenji Shuuya). Soccer in its current state is controlled and gives out commands whether the team loses purposely or wins the match. What used to be the “real soccer” is gone.

Summary
Matsukaze Tenma, along with the members of the Raimon team, now aim to free soccer so that everyone can finally play soccer freely without being ordered how to do it.

The rebellion starts against Fifth Sector, in this dark midst of times, the Raimon team will not go alone in this rebellion. With some unexpected help from the Resistance organization that aims to replace the Holy Emperor and with some help from the previous main characters of the Inazuma Eleven anime.

Theme Songs
Opening songs
 Ten Made Todoke! (eps 1-18), by T-Pistonz+KMC
 Naseba Naru no sa Nanairo Tamago (eps 19-33), by T-Pistonz+KMC
 Ohayou! Shining Day (eps 34-47), by T-Pistonz+KMC

Ending songs
 Yappa Seishun (eps 1-18), by Sorano Aoi (CV: Kitahara Sayaka)
 Kanari Junjou (eps 19-33), by Sorano Aoi (CV: Kitahara Sayaka)
 Hajike-Yo!! (eps 34-47), by Sorano Aoi (CV: Kitahara Sayaka)

Episode list

References

  Content in this article was copied from Inazuma Eleven GO (anime) at the Inazuma Eleven Wiki, which is licensed under the Creative Commons Attribution-Share Alike 3.0 (Unported) (CC-BY-SA) license.

Inazuma Eleven (anime)
Inazuma Eleven episode lists
2011 anime television series debuts
Japanese children's animated sports television series
OLM, Inc.
TV Tokyo original programming